The 2010 Pittsburgh Panthers football team represented the University of Pittsburgh in the 2010 NCAA Division I FBS football season. The Panthers were members of the Big East Conference. They were led by the sixth-year head coach Dave Wannstedt and played their home games at Heinz Field. 2010 marked the university's 121st season overall. They finished the season 8–5, 5–2 in Big East play to be champions of the Big East with Connecticut and West Virginia. However, due to losses to both schools, Pitt did not earn the conference's bid to a Bowl Championship Series (BCS) game. They were invited to the BBVA Compass Bowl where they defeated Kentucky, 27–10. Wannstedt was forced to resign on December 7, 2010.

Previous season
The Panthers finished the 2009 season with an overall record of 10–3, 5–2 in Big East Conference play. Pitt won the Meineke Car Care Bowl 19–17 against North Carolina for its eleventh bowl game victory.

Preseason

Preseason player honors

Six Panthers have been named to a combined total of 14 preseason award watch lists:

Senior defensive end Greg Romeus has been named to the Lombardi Award (down linemen), Chuck Bednarik Award (defensive player), Ted Hendricks Award (defensive end), Lott Trophy (defensive player of the year) and Bronko Nagurski Trophy (top defensive player) watch lists.

Senior offensive tackle Jason Pinkston was named to the Lombardi Award (down linemen) and Outland Trophy (interior linemen) watch lists.

Senior safety Dom DeCicco has been named to the Jim Thorpe Award (defensive back) watch list.

Senior kicker Dan Hutchins was named to the Lou Groza Award (top placekicker) watch list.

Junior receiver Jon Baldwin was named to the Maxwell Award (outstanding collegiate football player) and Biletnikoff Award (wide receiver) watch lists.

Sophomore running back Dion Lewis has been named to the Maxwell Award (outstanding collegiate football player), Walter Camp Player of the Year Award and Doak Walker Award (top running back) watch lists.

Preseason Big East Media Poll
On August 3, 2010, representatives of the media serving the eight Big East football markets voted Pitt as the favorite to win the 2010 Big East Football Conference championship. The Panthers received 22 of 24 possible first-place votes, and 2 second-place votes.

Schedule
The Panthers schedule was released February 10, 2010.

Coaching staff

Team players drafted into the NFL

Notable Undrafted Players:

Henry Hynoski: regarded as the #1 Fullback. He signed with the Giants shortly after the 2011 NFL lockout ended. Started all 16 games and in the playoffs during his rookie season, which the Giants would go on to win the Super Bowl.

Rankings

The Panthers debuted at #15 in the preseason Coaches' Poll. and in the preseason Associated Press (AP) Poll.

Sports Illustrated ranked Pitt #16 in the annual College Football Preview issue on August 16, 2010.

Rivals.com listed Pitt at #14 in their preseason picks on August 20, 2010.

CBSSports.com ranked Pitt #13 in the preseason rankings of all 120 FBS teams on August 30, 2010.

Game summaries

Utah

Sophomore Tino Sunseri made his first career start at quarterback. Pitt trailed 24–13 halfway through the fourth quarter. With 7:11 left, Sunseri completed a 44-yard touchdown pass to Jon Baldwin, and a two-point conversion made it 24–21. Dan Hutchins kicked a 30-yard field goal to tie the game and end regulation. In overtime, Utah won the toss and elected to play defense. On the first play of overtime, Sunseri was intercepted by Utah freshman Brian Blechen. A few plays later Joe Phillips made a 21-yard field goal to give the Utes the 27–24 victory.

Sunseri finished 16 of 28 with 184 yards, Dion Lewis carried 25 times for 75 yards and one touchdown, and Baldwin led receivers with four receptions for 71 yards and a touchdown.

New Hampshire

Pitt's first home game of the season was against the New Hampshire Wildcats, who at the time of the game were ranked as the #6 team in Division I FCS (I-AA). The Wildcats were able to contain Dion Lewis, who finished the game with 27 yards on 10 carries. However, sophomore Ray Graham had 9 carries for 116 yards and two touchdowns. Tino Sunseri improved in his second career start, completing 24 of 34 passes for 275 yards, 2 touchdowns, and 1 interception. The receiving touchdowns went to Cameron Saddler for 2 yards and Jon Baldwin for 56; Baldwin led receivers with 6 for 100 yards. Defensive end Greg Romeus sat out his second consecutive game due to injury, in hopes of returning against the Miami Hurricanes on September 23. However, Romeus underwent back surgery to relieve a herniated disc and will miss up to 6 weeks. Pitt improved its record against FCS teams to 9–0.

Miami

Miami and Pittsburgh last met in 2003 at Pittsburgh in a game won by Miami 28–14. Pittsburgh is 9–21–1 all time against Miami.

Florida International

Notre Dame

Syracuse

Rutgers

Louisville

Connecticut

 The Panthers lost this tight conference contest to the Connecticut Huskies 30–28. After UConn's Zach Frazer threw an interception on the first play of the game, the Panthers responded with a 4-yard touchdown run by Dion Lewis. UConn scored on the ensuing drive on a 36-yard pass from Frazer to Kashif Moore to tie the game at 7. Dave Teggart added 2 field goals to give Connecticut a 13–7 lead in the third quarter.
Later in the third quarter, the Panthers were able to get their offense going when Tino Sunseri completed a 42-yard pass to Jon Baldwin. The Panthers scored on the drive with a one-yard run from Lewis. After a Connecticut punt, Pitt extended its lead to 21–13 on a Ray Graham touchdown run. On the ensuing kickoff, UConn's Nick Williams returned the kick 95 yards for a touchdown to make the score 21–20 in favor of the Panthers at the end of the third quarter.
After trading punts to begin the fourth quarter, Connecticut took a 23–21 lead on a 25-yard field goal from Teggart. Then UConn's Robbie Frey recovered a Graham fumble on the following kick-off for UConn. Two plays later, Frazer threw a 14-yard touchdown pass to Isiah Moore to extend the Connecticut lead to 30–21. The Panthers scored on their next possession when they went 70 yards in only 1 minute and 50 seconds on a 20-yard touchdown catch by Baldwin. UConn got the ball back at their ten-yard line with 4:29 left in the game and a 2-point lead. With 2:50 left in the game, and the ball on their own 19-yard line, Connecticut faced a fourth down with one yard to gain.  Instead of punting the ball back to the Panthers, they handed the ball to Todman, who gained 4 yards and the first down. If UConn had failed to get the first down, the Panthers would have been given the ball within range to kick a go-ahead field goal. Todman gained 41 yards on the final drive, and UConn ran the remaining time off the clock to give the Panthers their first conference loss of the season.

South Florida

West Virginia

In the 103rd edition of the Backyard Brawl, West Virginia defeated the Panthers 35–10 at Heinz Field. The Panthers controlled their own destiny coming into the game, and likely needed to win their last two games to claim the Big East title and BCS bowl berth outright, but West Virginia would defeat Pitt for the second year in a row, giving Pitt a shot at at least a share of the Big East title with a win in their final game of the season against Cincinnati.

Cincinnati

In the 10th edition of the River City Rivalry, the Panthers defeated the Cincinnati Bearcats 28–10 at Nippert Stadium. The Panthers were led by sophomore running back Dion Lewis who rushed for a career-high 261 yards against Cincinnati, 6th most in a single game in Pitt history, and 4 touchdowns. With their win over Cincinnati, Pitt won a share of the Big East title along with West Virginia and Connecticut. This title would be Pitt's second and last shared title in the Big East (they never won a Big East Title outright). The Panthers would go on to play in the BBVA Compass Bowl with UConn representing the Big East in its BCS bowl due to UConn's wins over the two other Big East co-champions Pitt and West Virginia. This was also the last game for coach Dave Wannstedt who resigned December 7, 2010.

BBVA Compass Bowl

Post-season
On December 7, 2010, Wannstedt resigned as head  coach, reportedly under pressure following a disappointing 7–5 regular season and having failed to advance to a BCS bowl during his tenure. Wannstedt accepted a position as special assistant to the athletic director at the university.

Following this, Michael Haywood, the former coach of the Miami University Redhawks, was hired as Pitt's new head coach on December 16, 2010.  Haywood was arrested on December 31, 2010, on a charge of domestic battery, which was later upgraded to a felony.  Pitt chancellor Mark Nordenberg announced Haywood's firing the next day, on January 1, 2011.

Wannstedt announced on January 3 that he would not coach the bowl game and defensive coordinator Phil Bennett would take over the team on an interim basis for the BBVA Compass Bowl against Kentucky, which Pitt won 27–10.

Controversy also arose when an investigation by Sports Illustrated revealed that the university's 2010 football team had 22 players with criminal records, the most by any team ranked in the magazine's pre-season top 25 rankings. Athletic Director Steve Pederson called the number of incidents "totally unacceptable", stating that the athletic department was "addressing the situation" including having already instituted more intense "background research". Ousted coach Dave Wannstedt defended his past "body of work" but acknowledged "an unfortunate stretch of incidents" the previous summer stating that "every player and each incident was evaluated on an individual basis" and that "we did our due diligence to make sure that we treated each player fair". The Sports Illustrated report received criticism for its lack of context, methodology, and sensationalism.

References

Pittsburgh
Pittsburgh Panthers football seasons
Big East Conference football champion seasons
Birmingham Bowl champion seasons
Pittsburgh Panthers football